Isomoralla eriscota is a species of moth in the family Oecophoridae and occurs in Australia. The adult has brown forewings with lighter brown bands.

References

Moths of Australia
Moths described in 1889
Oecophorinae